Télesphore-Eusèbe Normand (August 18, 1832 – April 3, 1918) was a politician from Quebec, Canada.

Background

He was born on August 18, 1832 in Quebec City.  He was a notary.  He was married to Alphonsine Giroux in 1856 and to Marie Dufresne in 1893.

Mayor of Trois-Rivières

Normand served as a Council member from 1861 to 1865 and as a Mayor of Trois-Rivières from 1873 to 1876 and from 1889 to 1894.

Provincial Politics

He ran as a Liberal candidate in the district of Champlain in 1867 and 1871.  Each time he lost.  He also lost an 1876 by-election as a Conservative in the district of Trois-Rivières.

However he won the general election in the same district in 1890 and 1892.  The 1892 general election was cancelled, but he won the by-election that followed.  He was re-elected in 1897, but did not run for re-election in 1900.

Death

Normand died on April 3, 1918.

Footnotes

1832 births
1918 deaths
Conservative Party of Quebec MNAs
Mayors of Trois-Rivières